W. Paul Reeve (born July 27, 1968) is an American historian and Simmons Professor of Mormon Studies and History in the History Department at the University of Utah.

Reeve is a noted scholar of Mormon race history and Utah history.

Reeve was born in Hurricane, Utah. He holds a B.A. and M.A. from Brigham Young University and a Ph.D. in history from University of Utah, where he studied with Dean L. May. Prior to teaching at University of Utah, Reeve taught at Southern Virginia University and Salt Lake Community College.

Reeve oversees the digital project Century of Black Mormons, which identifies Black Mormons across the United States baptized into the Church of Jesus Christ between 1830 and 1930.

Reeve has been the recipient of the University of Utah's Early Career Teaching Award, and the College of Humanities' Ramona W. Cannon Award for Teaching Excellence in the Humanities.

His book Religion of a Different Color was the winner of the Mormon History Association's Best Book Award, the John Whitmer Historical Association's Smith-Pettit Best Book Award, and the Utah State Historical Society's Francis Armstrong Madsen Best History Book Award.

Bibliography

References

1968 births
Living people
Brigham Young University alumni
University of Utah alumni
University of Utah faculty
Southern Virginia University faculty
Salt Lake Community College people
Historians from Utah
Mormonism and race
21st-century American historians
Historians of Utah
People from Hurricane, Utah